Sleeper Catcher is the fourth studio album by the Little River Band, released in April 1978. It peaked at No. 4 on the Australian Kent Music Report Albums Chart and No. 16 on the Billboard 200. The album was certified Platinum by the RIAA in May 1979.

At the Australian 1978 King of Pop Awards the album won Most Popular Australian Album.

The band is shown on the cover of the album playing the Australian game Two-up, and the Sleeper Catcher is a participant who retrieves bets left behind by a tardy gambler in the game.

This is the band's last album to feature George McArdle on bass.

Track listing

Australian version
 Side A
"Fall from Paradise" (Beeb Birtles/Graham Goble) - 3:59
"Lady" (Graham Goble) - 4:50
"Red-Headed Wild Flower" (Beeb Birtles/Ed Nimmervoll) - 4:35
"Light of Day" (Beeb Birtles) - 8:03
 Side B
"So Many Paths" (Glenn Shorrock/Idris Jones) - 4:24
"Reminiscing" (Graham Goble) - 4:13
"Sanity's Side" (Glenn Shorrock/Chris Dawes) - 4:14
"Shut Down Turn Off" (Glenn Shorrock) - 3:51
"One for the Road" (Beeb Birtles/Graham Goble) - 4:01

American version
 Side A
"Shut Down Turn Off" (Glenn Shorrock) - 3:51
"Reminiscing" (Graham Goble) - 4:13
"Red-Headed Wild Flower" (Beeb Birtles/Ed Nimmervoll) - 4:35
"Light of Day" (Beeb Birtles) - 8:03

 Side B
"Fall from Paradise" (Beeb Birtles/Graham Goble) - 3:59
"Lady" (Graham Goble) - 4:50
"Sanity's Side" (Glen Shorrock/Chris Dawes) - 4:14
"So Many Paths" (Glen Shorrock/Idris Jones) - 4:24
"One for the Road" (Beeb Birtles/Graham Goble) - 4:01
Bonus tracks in the 1996 reissue
"Take Me Home" (Beeb Birtles) - 3:49
"Changed and Different" (Graham Goble) - 4:02

Bonus track on the 2022 remaster
"Recordando" (Graham Goble) - 4:12

Personnel
 Glenn Shorrock - lead vocals
 David Briggs - lead and Roland synthesizer guitars
 Beeb Birtles - electric and acoustic guitars, vocals
 Graham Goble - electric and acoustic guitars, vocals, vocal arrangements
 George McArdle - bass
 Derek Pellicci - Sonor and Syndrums drums, percussion

Additional musicians
 Vernon Hill - flute
 Bob Venier - flugelhorn
 Pam Raines - harp
 Peter Sullivan - electric and acoustic pianos
 Peter Jones - electric piano (2)
 Mal Logan - Hammond organ
 Rick Formosa - conductor, orchestral arrangements

Charts

Weekly charts

Year-end charts

Certifications

References 

1978 albums
Little River Band albums
Albums produced by John Boylan (record producer)
EMI Records albums
Harvest Records albums